Luis Arlindo de Jesus dos Santos, better known as Arlindo Maracanã or Maracanã (St. Louis, October 2, 1978) is a Brazilian footballer who plays as right back.

Career
He is a right side defender that has passed through countless clubs with major Ceará, which has always been seen as an idol. He was also highlighted in Sampaio Corrêa, in which was revealed to the team of Ceará. He is well known in the northeast to have a very powerful kick, thus making many free-kicks over long distances, he won over the Alvinegra crowd. He is the only player in the history of Ceará who served in positions 11, acted as a few minutes as a goalkeeper with the expulsion of Adilson. In 2008, at the request of Silas, he moved to Avai which was part of the cast, making several important goals in the campaign team in winning access to the Brazilian Championship Serie A Serie B in 2008.

In the second round of the Santa Catarina Football Championship in 2009 after family problems, and Arlindo Avai reached an agreement and the player was released. In March 2009, he returned to the club that made him famous, Ceará . In 2010, he was loaned to Brasiliense, but returned to Ceará in the same year. For the 2011 season, he was loaned to Railroad. In September 2011, terminated the contract with Ceará and signed with Sampaio Corrêa, later to compete in the Championship Series D.

Honours
Sampaio Corrêa 
 Campeonato Brasileiro Série C: 1997
 Campeonato Brasileiro Série D: 2012
 Campeonato Maranhense: 2012, 2014
 Copa União do Maranhão: 2011, 2012

Avaí 
 Campeonato Catarinense: 2009

Ceará 
 Campeonato Cearense: 2002, 2006

Contract
 Ceará.

References

External links
ogol.com.br

1978 births
Living people
People from São Luís, Maranhão
Brazilian footballers
Campeonato Brasileiro Série A players
Campeonato Brasileiro Série B players
Campeonato Brasileiro Série C players
Sampaio Corrêa Futebol Clube players
Fluminense FC players
Ceará Sporting Club players
CR Vasco da Gama players
Sociedade Esportiva e Recreativa Caxias do Sul players
Esporte Clube Bahia players
Sertãozinho Futebol Clube players
Avaí FC players
Brasiliense Futebol Clube players
Ferroviário Atlético Clube (CE) players
Sampaio Corrêa Futebol Clube managers
Association football fullbacks
Brazilian football managers
Sportspeople from Maranhão